Mayandi Kudumbathar is a 2009 Indian Tamil-language drama film written and directed by  Rasu Madhuravan, who directed Poomagal Oorvalam and Pandi previously. Starring ten Tamil film directors, including Manivannan, Seeman, Tarun Gopi, Ponvannan, and K. P. Jagannath in lead and supporting roles. The film, scored by Sabesh–Murali and filmed by Balabharani, was released on 5 June 2009, going on to become critically and commercially successful and blockbuster at the box office.

Plot
The film is set in the backdrop of a village near Usilampatti, in Madurai district. Mayandi (Manivannan) and Virumandi (G. M. Kumar) are siblings with disputes over settling their properties. Mayandi insists giving a portion of their ancestral properties to their stepsister, for which Virumandi does not agree. This creates enmity in Virumandi and his sons against Mayandi and his family.

Mayandi has four sons - Thavasi (Ponvannan), Virumandi (Seeman), Cheenisamy (K. P. Jagannath) and Paraman (Tarun Gopi) - and one daughter - Mayakka (Deepa Shankar). All the sons except Paraman marry, and they live as a joint family. Paraman falls in love with his schoolmate Poongodi (Poongodi). He gets admission into engineering, and Mayandi sells a portion of his land to pay fees for Paraman. This angers the wives of Thavasi and Virumandi. They keep insisting on partitioning the properties between four sons, thinking that Mayandi is spending more for the education of Paraman, while the other three sons are not educated properly. However, Paraman's brothers are actually so affectionate towards him, and they prefer staying together. Suddenly, Mayandi passes away due to an electric shock when he steps over a wire unknowingly. Now, the wives of Thavasi and Virumandi again keep insisting on doing the property partition. Their plan gets executed: the properties get partitioned into three, leaving Paraman as his portion was already sold by Mayandi to pay the college fees.

Paraman could not bear his father's death, and Poongodi shows affection to him. Poongodi gets admission into Madras Medical College, and she leaves to Chennai for education, though she keeps talking to Paraman regularly on the phone. Paraman continues his engineering course while he is considered as a burden by his sisters-in-law. However, his brothers take care of him. One day, Thavasi's wife falls sick, and she needs blood urgently. As it is a rare group, it becomes difficult. Paraman informs this to his friends in college, and his friends come for rescue. Thavasi's wife is saved, and she realizes her mistake and feels bad for ill-treating Paraman despite which he helped her in a timely manner.

Paraman secures a job through campus placement, and his living condition improves. One day, he gets shocked to see Poongodi in a bus stop along with her husband and a baby. Paraman cries upon thinking that Poongodi has betrayed him. However, Poongodi tells a flashback that her "husband" is actually her relative who lost his leg in an accident on the day of the marriage, following which the marriage gets cancelled. Now, her parents request Poongodi to marry the groom as it would be an insult for the entire family due to a cancelled marriage. Poongodi, though not interested, accepts for the sake of her family's wishes. Still, she kept calling Paraman over the phone in the usual manner so that he will not get broken and instead will concentrate on studies. Knowing the truth, Paraman feels happy about Poongodi's kind heart and her sacrifice for the welfare of her family.

Finally, Paraman meets Virumandi and cries to him to lead a joint life along with everyone. He also wins the heart of Virumandi and his sons also and marries his aunt's daughter.

Cast

 Manivannan as Mayandi (Virumandi's younger brother)
 Ponvannan as Thavasi Mayandi (Mayandi's son and Virumandi's Nephew )
 Seeman as Virumandi Mayandi (Mayandi's son and Virumandi's Nephew )
 K. P. Jagannath as Cheenichamy Mayandi (Mayandi's son and Virumandi's Nephew )
 Tarun Gopi as Paraman Mayandi (Mayandi's son and Virumandi's Nephew )
 G. M. Kumar as Virumandi (Mayandi's older brother)
 Ravi Mariya as Chokkan Virumandi (Virumandi's son and Mayandi's Nephew )
 Nandha Periyasamy as Chinnu Virumandi (Virumandi's son and Mayandi's Nephew )
 Singampuli as Mayandi Virumandi (Virumandi's mentally challenged son)
 Raj Kapoor as Sonakkaruppu (Mayandi's son-in-law and moneylender)
 Ilavarasu as Mayandi and Virumandi's elder cousin
 Mayilsamy as Mayandi and Virumandi's younger cousin
 Poongodi as Poongodi
 Poovitha as Thavamani Thavasi
 Kaniya as Pavunu Virumandi
 Hemalatha as Dhanam Cheenichamy
 Deepa Shankar as Mayakka Sonakkarupu
 Priya as Azhagamma
 Thamizharasi as Pecchi

Soundtrack
The soundtrack was composed by Sabesh–Murali and lyrics written by Na. Muthukumar, Nandalala, Eknath, Tamilamutham, Kalaikumar and Seeman.
 "Mudhal Mazhaye" - Balram, Saindhavi
 "Pesama Pesama" - Seeman
 "Poottu Siricha" - Krishnaraj, Sabesh
 "Onna Thangave" - Vijay Yesudas
 "Kalavaniye" - Ranjith, Madhumitha
 "Poo Mudhal" - Prasanna

Reception
Rediff wrote, "Sometimes, there's a strong whiff of Vikraman's screenplay, especially when Sabesh-Murali pops in with their theme song; at others, you're reminded very strongly of the sentimental sagas of the 60s, when every character had miles of dialogue to cover and spoke reams about love, loyalty, duty and country".

Behindwoods wrote, "Mayandi Kudumbathar is not probably for those who are city-bred. But if you appreciate the so-called ‘family movies’ that could be watched with families and do not mind a heavy dose of tearjerker sentiment, then you might just like this one."

Legacy
In November 2020, it was reported that filmmaker Nandha Periyasamy was planning to make Mayandi Kudumbathar 2, a spiritual sequel to the film, with Gautham Karthik in the lead role. The pair subsequently collaborated for a separate family drama titled Anandham Vilayadum Veedu (2021).

References

External links
 Official website
 

2009 films
2000s Tamil-language films
Films directed by Rasu Madhuravan